The close front unrounded vowel, or high front unrounded vowel, is a type of vowel sound that occurs in most spoken languages, represented in the International Phonetic Alphabet by the symbol i. It is similar to the vowel sound in the English word meet—and often called long-e in American English. Although in English this sound has additional length (usually being represented as ) and is not normally pronounced as a pure vowel (it is a slight diphthong), some dialects have been reported to pronounce the phoneme as a pure sound. A pure  sound is also heard in many other languages, such as French, in words like chic.

The close front unrounded vowel is the vocalic equivalent of the palatal approximant .

Features

Occurrence

Notes

References

External links
 

Close vowels
Front vowels
Unrounded vowels